Piezo ignition is a type of ignition that is used in portable camping stoves, gas grills and some lighters. Piezo ignition uses the principle of piezoelectricity, which, in short, is the electric charge that accumulates in some materials in response to mechanical deformation. It consists of a small, spring-loaded hammer which, when a button is pressed, hits a crystal of PZT. This sudden forceful deformation produces a high voltage and subsequent electrical discharge, which ignites the gas.

No external electric connection is required, though wires are sometimes used to place the sparking location away from the crystal itself. Piezo ignition systems can be operated by either a lever, push-button or built into the control knob. An electric spark is usually generated once per turn of the knob or press of the button.

References

External links 
 Piezo Disassembly — Exposing the piezo element in a barbecue lighter
 Piezo Igniter Life — A destructive test of igniter lifetime

Firelighting using electricity